Turcinești is a commune in Gorj County, Oltenia, Romania. It is composed of four villages: Cartiu, Horezu, Rugi and Turcinești.

References

Communes in Gorj County
Localities in Oltenia